Live at the Boat Club is an album by the British rock band Trapeze.

Recorded on 13 September 1975 live at the Boat Club in Nottingham for a UK live radio broadcast featuring tracks from their four mid-1970s albums Medusa (1970), You Are the Music...We're Just the Band (1972), Hot Wire (1974), and Trapeze (1976). The CD includes a 12-page booklet with rare photos, biography and liner notes from lead guitarist Mel Galley.

Track listing
 "Back Street Love" – 5:13
 "You Are the Music" – 5:19
 "Jury" – 13:59
 "Star Breaker" – 3:37
 "Way Back to the Bone" – 9:44
 "Medusa" – 8:07
 "Black Cloud" – 15:30
 "Sunny Side of the Street" – 2:58
 "The Raid" – 3:55

Trapeze
 Mel Galley – guitars, lead vocals
 Rob Kendrick – guitars
 Pete Wright – bass
 Dave Holland – drums, percussion
 Terry Rowley - synthesizer

References

External links
 Review and 30 Sec sample of all tracks at barnesandnoble.com

Trapeze (band) albums
1975 live albums